Aclytia mariamne is a moth of the family Erebidae. It was described by Herbert Druce in 1855. It is found in Colombia.

References

Moths described in 1855
Aclytia
Moths of South America